Məlikkənd (also, Melikkend) is a village and municipality in the Goychay Rayon of Azerbaijan.  It has a population of 1,055. The municipality consists of the villages of Məlikkənd and Şıxəmir.

References 

Populated places in Goychay District